Pejibaye District
 Pejibaye District, Jiménez, Costa Rica
 Pejibaye District, Pérez Zeledón, Costa Rica

District name disambiguation pages